The 1930 World Table Tennis Championships mixed doubles was the fourth edition of the mixed doubles championship.  

Miklós Szabados and Mária Mednyánszky defeated István Kelen and Anna Sipos in the final by three sets to one.

Results

See also
List of World Table Tennis Championships medalists

References

-